Calliotropis (Schepmanotropis)  is a subgenus of sea snail, a marine gastropod mollusk in the family Eucyclidae.

Species
 Calliotropis (Schepmanotropis) calcarata (Schepman, 1908) represented as Calliotropis calcarata (Schepman, 1908)

References

External links
 Worms Link

 
Gastropod subgenera